Denzil Onslow may refer to:
Denzil Onslow (cricketer) (1802-1879)
Denzil Onslow of Pyrford ( – 1721), British politician, Member of Parliament for several constituencies
Denzil Onslow of Stoughton ( – 1765), British politician, Member of Parliament for Guildford
Denzil Onslow (British Army officer) (1770–1838), general in the British Army and amateur cricketer
Denzil Onslow (Conservative politician) (1839–1908), British politician, Member of Parliament for Guildford